Ancylolomia atrifasciata is a moth in the family Crambidae. It was described by George Hampson in 1919. It is found in Kenya.

References

Endemic moths of Kenya
Ancylolomia
Moths described in 1919
Moths of Africa